Charles Jeffrey (died 9 May 1915) was a Scottish footballer who played as an outside left in the Scottish League for Abercorn.

Personal life 
Prior to the First World War, Jeffrey was the assistant schoolmaster at the Perth Barracks. He served as a sergeant in the Black Watch during the First World War and was killed on 9 May 1915. He is commemorated on the Le Touret Memorial.

Career statistics

References 

Scottish footballers
Scottish Football League players
Year of birth missing
Place of birth missing
Association football fullbacks
Hibernian F.C. players
Dundee F.C. players
Bathgate F.C. players
1915 deaths
British Army personnel of World War I
Black Watch soldiers
British military personnel killed in World War I
Scottish schoolteachers